Parashorea malaanonan is a species of plant in the family Dipterocarpaceae. it is found in the Philippines and the northeast coast of Sabah in Borneo. The name malaanonan is derived from Tagalog (mala = false and anonang = custard apple) and is a putative vernacular name for this species. It is a large emergent tree, up to 60 m, found in mixed dipterocarp forests on deep friable clay soils. It can still be found in forest reserves in the east coast of Sabah although elsewhere it is threatened by habitat loss. The timber is a light hardwood sold under the trade name of white lauan or white seraya.

References

malaanonan
Critically endangered plants
Trees of Borneo
Flora of Sabah
Trees of the Philippines
Taxonomy articles created by Polbot
Taxa named by Francisco Manuel Blanco